Jess Thirlby (born 15 November 1979), previously known as Jess Garland, is a former England netball international and the current head coach of the England national netball team. As a player, she was a member of the Team Bath squad that won the inaugural 2005–06 Netball Superleague title. She also represented England at the 2002 Commonwealth Games. As a head coach, she guided Team Bath to further Netball Superleague titles in 2008–09, 2009–10 and 2013. In July 2019, Thirlby was appointed head coach of the senior England national netball team.

Early life and family
Jess Thirlby is the daughter of Chris Garland, who is a former professional football player, and his wife, Patricia Cooper. She has two brothers, Adam and Ryan. She is married to Rob Thirlby, who is a former England rugby sevens international. Her husband also represented England at the 2002 Commonwealth Games. She is a mother of two children and stepmother to a third.

Playing career

Team Bath
Between 1999 and 2006, Thirlby played for Team Bath. She was one of Team Bath's first full-time players. Between 2001 and 2005, she played in all five Team Bath Super Cup campaigns, making 31 appearances. In 2004 she was a member of the Team Bath squad that won the Super Cup. She was also a member of the Team Bath squad that won the inaugural 2005–06 Netball Superleague title. Her team mates at Team Bath included  Pamela Cookey, Rachel Dunn, Stacey Francis, Tamsin Greenway and Geva Mentor. She called a quits to her coaching career after a combined 30 years of being involved with Team Bath and after helping them win five national titles.

England
Thirlby represented England at every level from under-16 to senior. Between 2000 and 2006 she was a regular member of the senior squad. She also represented England at the 2002 Commonwealth Games.

Coaching career

Celtic Dragons
During the 2006–07 Netball Superleague season, Thirlby served as head coach of Celtic Dragons.

Team Bath
During the 2007–08 Netball Superleague season, Thirlby served as an assistant coach to Jan Crabtree at Team Bath. She was appointed Team Bath's head coach for the 2008–09 Netball Superleague season. She subsequently guided Team Bath to further Netball Superleague titles in 2008–09, 2009–10 and 2013. Between  2015 and 2019, Thirlby served as Team Bath's director of netball.

England
While still an active player, Thirlby coached the England under-17 and under-19 teams during 2004 and 2005. She later served as both an assistant coach and head coach with the England under-21 team at the 2009 and 2013 World Youth Cups. Between 2013 and 2015 she served as an assistant coach to Anna Mayes with the senior England team. In July 2019 Thirlby was appointed head coach of the senior England team, taking over from Tracey Neville.

Honours

Player
Team Bath
Netball Superleague
Winners: 2005–06: 1
Super Cup
Winners: 2004: 1

Head coach
Team Bath
Netball Superleague
Winners: 2008–09, 2009–10, 2013: 3

References

1979 births
Living people
English netball players
Netball players at the 2002 Commonwealth Games
Commonwealth Games competitors for England
Team Bath netball players
AENA Super Cup players
Netball Superleague players
Netball Superleague coaches
Sportspeople from Bristol
English netball coaches
England national netball team coaches
Team Bath (netball) coaches
Rugby union players' wives and girlfriends